Krzysztof Rutkowski (born April 6, 1960 in Teresin near Sochaczew, Poland) is a former private detective, Polish ex-politician, former member of Sejm, occasional actor and celebrity. Rutkowski himself claims to be the most renowned Polish private detective. He began his career specializing in finding and returning stolen vehicles and works of art.

Rutkowski also took part in many TV footages and popularized shows like the Detektyw series of the TVN station, which depicts the life and methods of a private detective.

Later in his career, Rutkowski rescued many kidnapped people, including Polish women who had married Muslim men and could not escape the harsh reality of the Middle-East and wanted to return to Poland, but were mistreated and detained by their husbands and families. Rutkowski captured numerous criminals who were hiding abroad and could not be extradited.
Rutkowski's actions often caused strong diplomatic protests because he used his diplomatic passport to enter other countries, which he would not have been allowed to enter with a regular passport.
Those events were also presented in the aforementioned TV series.

Repatriation of Polish 9-year old from Norway
In June 2011, Rutkowski led a group of civilians who freed a 9-year old Polish girl from the custody of Norwegian authorities, and repatriated her. Reactions included Khalid Skah's comment that "Now Norwegian authorities can taste their own medicine." (Skah has had two of his children freed by a group of Norwegians including commando/Lieutenant Commander T.A.Bolle.

In December 2011, a Polish court ruled that the child would not be sent back to Norway.

Repatriation of a Russian-born teenager from Norway
A Russian-born teenager arrived in Russia in November 2011, after Rutkowski removed him from the custody of Norwegian authorities and transferred him to Poland.

References

External links

 Abw.gov.pl

1960 births
Living people
Private detectives and investigators
Islam in Poland
MEPs for Poland 2004
Members of the Polish Sejm 2001–2005
People from Sochaczew County